Malacothrix glabrata, commonly known as the smooth desert dandelion or desert dandelion, is an annual plant in the family Asteraceae. It is common to the southwestern deserts of North America and has showy pale-yellow to white flowers. The name "glabrata" refers to the leaves being (nearly) hairless. Like other members of its genus, it has a milky sap and flower heads composed of smaller strap-like flowers called "ligules".

The species is native to the western United States, excluding much of the Pacific Northwest, and into northern Mexico. It is a dicot.

Its fragrant, daisy-like flower heads are in shades of yellow or white, and flower heads may have an orange to red "button" in the center of the flower head, composed of several immature flowers.

Gallery

References

External links
Jepson Manual Treatment
USDA Plants Profile
CalFlora
Flora of North America
Photo gallery

glabrata